This is a list of notable footballers who have played for Olympique de Marseille. Generally, this means players that have appeared in 100 or more first-class (league, French Cup, League Cup and European) matches for the club. However, some players who have played fewer matches are also included; players who fell short of the total of 100 appearances but made significant contributions to the history of the club or have involved in 1990–91 European Cup, 1992–93 UEFA Champions League, 1998–99 UEFA Cup and 2003–04 UEFA Cup. For a full list of all Marseille players with Wikipedia articles—major or otherwise—see Category:Olympique de Marseille players.

Players are listed according to the date of their first professional contract signed with the club. Appearances and goals are for competitive first-team matches only. Substitute appearances included.

List of players

Max Scheuer, Austrian, defender.

Key to positions

Notes

External links
  om1899.com player history

Marseille Olympique
 
Olympique de Marseille
Association football player non-biographical articles